Acidaliodes is a genus of moths of the family Noctuidae. The genus was erected by George Hampson in 1910.

Species
Acidaliodes atripuncta Hampson, 1910 Brazil (Espiritu Santo)
Acidaliodes celenna (Druce, 1892) Guatemala
Acidaliodes costipuncta Hampson, 1911 Peru
Acidaliodes enona (Druce, 1892) Mexico
Acidaliodes excisa Hampson, 1910 Colombia
Acidaliodes flavipars Dyar, 1914 Panama
Acidaliodes infantilis Schaus, 1912 Costa Rica
Acidaliodes irrorata Hampson, 1918 Peru
Acidaliodes lycaugesia Hampson, 1910 Brazil (Amazonas)
Acidaliodes mela Dyar, 1914 Panama
Acidaliodes melasticta Hampson, 1914 New Guinea
Acidaliodes perstriata (Hampson, 1907) Sri Lanka
Acidaliodes strenualis Hampson, 1914 Borneo
Acidaliodes truncata Hampson, 1910 Panama
Acidaliodes umber Dyar, 1914 Panama
Acidaliodes zattu Schaus, 1911 Costa Rica

References

Acontiinae
Noctuoidea genera